Siddique Ismail is an Indian film director, screenwriter, actor and producer who predominantly works in Malayalam cinema. 
He made his directorial debut with the Malayalam movie Ramji Rao Speaking in 1989. As a screenwriter, he made his debut in the Malayalam movie Pappan Priyappetta Pappan in 1986.
His last film to hit the screens was Big Brother.

Personal life
Siddique Ismail was born to Ismail Haji and Zainaba in Kochi on 1 August 1954. He is a alumnus of St. Paul's College, Kalamassery. He married Sajitha on 6 May 1984. The couple have three daughters Sumaya, Sara, and Sukoon.

Career
He began his career as an assistant director to Fazil. The duo of Siddique and Lal was spotted by Fazil when he saw them performing in the Cochin Kalabhavan troupe. Siddique later teamed up with Lal to create many films and was credited as Siddique-Lal. The duo has since split up, Siddique has continued with his directorial ventures, while Lal has turned to acting and producing. Siddique's films are all in the comedy genre. Siddique's films in Tamil have mostly been remakes of his Malayalam films.

His film Bodyguard in Malayalam has been remade into Tamil as Kaavalan by Siddique himself. He also remade the film into Hindi as Bodyguard. Siddique co-produce films with Jenso Jose under their joint company S Talkies.

Awards

Kerala State Film Awards :-
  Best Film with Popular Appeal and Aesthetic Value  (1991) 
Zee Cine Awards :-
  Zee Cine Awards for Best Debut Director  (2012)

Filmography

Films

As actor
Nokkethadhoorathu Kannum Nattu (1984)...Man at calling Kunjoonjamma nickname church going time
Poovinu Puthiya Poonthennal (1986)...Man at priest's place
Varsham 16 (1989)...Karthik's friend
Manathe Kottaram (1995) ... himself (guest at the wedding)
Five Star Hospital (1997) ... Himself in two songs "Ithra Madhurikkumo" and "Maranno Nee"
Gulumaal: The Escape (2009) ... Himself
Cinema Company (2012) ... himself
Masterpiece (2017) ... himself
Innale Vare (2022) ... himself
Kenkemam (2022) ... Special appearance

As producer
2017: Fukri
2019: Big Brother

Television
Mammootty the Best Actor Award (Asianet) as Judge
Comedy Festival (Mazhavil Manorama) as Judge
Cinema Chirima (Mazhavil Manorama) as Host
Comedy Festival Season 2 (Mazhavil manorama) as Judge
Aaraanee Malayalee (Manorama News) as anchor
Comedy Stars Season 2 (Asianet) as Judge
Top Singer Super night as Judge

References

External links
 

Living people
20th-century Indian film directors
Indian male screenwriters
Malayalam film directors
Hindi-language film directors
Film directors from Kochi
Malayali people
21st-century Indian film directors
Screenwriters from Kochi
Film producers from Kochi
Malayalam film producers
20th-century Indian dramatists and playwrights
21st-century Indian dramatists and playwrights
20th-century Indian male writers
21st-century Indian male writers
Year of birth missing (living people)